Abraham Jonathan (Abram) Hostetler (November 22, 1818 – November 24, 1899) was a U.S. Representative from Indiana from 1879 to 1881.

Biography 
Born in Washington County, Indiana, Hostetler attended the common schools, and apprenticed to learn the blacksmith's trade.  He later engaged in agricultural pursuits.  He served as member of the Indiana Senate from 1854 to 1858.

Congress 
Hostetler was elected as a Democrat to the Forty-Sixth Congress (March 4, 1879 – March 3, 1881).  He was an unsuccessful candidate for reelection in 1880 to the Forty-Seventh Congress.

Later career and death 
He then engaged in mercantile pursuits, and served as delegate to the Democratic National Convention in 1880.  He died near Bedford, Indiana, November 24, 1899.  He was interred in the Leatherwood Church Cemetery, near Bedford, Indiana.

References

External links

 

1818 births
1899 deaths
American Disciples of Christ
Democratic Party Indiana state senators
People from Bedford, Indiana
Democratic Party members of the United States House of Representatives from Indiana
19th-century American politicians
Burials in Indiana